Circle City Prep (also known as Circle City Preparatory Charter School or CCP) is a co-educational public charter school located on the Far Eastside of Indianapolis, Indiana. The school will open in August 2017 with the founding Kindergarten and First Grade class, with 56 students each.  It will grow by one grade level each year until it reaches full capacity in 2024, becoming an elementary and middle school. This enrollment strategy allows Circle City Prep to maintain a small school atmosphere, support by three academies, and provide supports for all learners.

See also

References

External links
 Circle City Prep Website

Charter schools in Indiana
Public elementary schools in Indiana
Public middle schools in Indiana
Schools in Indianapolis
Charter K–8 schools in the United States